In gene expression, DSIF (DRB Sensitivity Inducing Factor) is a protein that can either negatively or positively affect transcription by RNA polymerase II (Pol II).  In one case of negative regulation, it can interact with negative elongation factor (NELF) to promote the stalling of Pol II at some genes.  This stalling is relieved by P-TEFb.  In humans, DSIF is composed of hSPT4 and hSPT5 (SPT4 and SPT5 are homologs in yeast).

The complex locks the RNAP clamp into a closed state to prevent the elongation complex (EC) from dissociating. The Spt5 NGN domain helps anneal the two strands of DNA upstream. The single KOW domain in bacteria and archaea anchors a ribosome to the RNAP.

In bacteria, the homologous complex only contains NusG, a Spt5 homolog. Archaea have both proteins.

References 

Gene expression